Pirayiri  (also spelled Pirayari) is a residential and commercial area in Palakkad city.It is located about  from the city centre.It belongs to Pirayiri gram panchayat in the Palakkad district, state of Kerala, India.

Demographics
As of 2011 India census, Pirayiri had a population of 41,359 with a density of 2212.89km^2 over an area of 18.69 Sq.Km.

References
.    3.Census towns in Palakkad districthttps://www.citypopulation.de/php/india-kerala.php?adm2id=3206

Villages in Palakkad district
Gram panchayats in Palakkad district
 
Suburbs of Palakkad
Cities and towns in Palakkad district